The  is the name of Japanese aerial lift line, as well as its operator. Opened in 1957, the line climbs Myōken Peak of Mount Unzen, Unzen, Nagasaki. It attracts the visitor with the view of the surrounding nature, especially azaleas in spring and autumn colors in autumn.

Basic data
System: Aerial tramway, 1 track cable and 2 haulage ropes
Cable length: 
Vertical interval: 
Maximum gradient: 30°40′
Operational speed: 3.6 m/s
Passenger capacity per a cabin: 36
Cabins: 2
Stations: 2
Duration of one-way trip: 3 minutes

See also
List of aerial lifts in Japan

External links
 Official website

Aerial tramways in Japan
1957 establishments in Japan